Honky Tonk Nights is a 1978 American comedy and drama film directed by Charles Webb. The film stars Carol Doda, Jack Elliott, Georgina Spelvin, The Hotlicks and Dan Carter in the lead roles.

Cast
 Carol Doda
 Jack Elliott
 Georgina Spelvin
 Serena
 The Hotlicks
 Dan Carter
 Jim Haynie
 Bermuda Schwartz
 Chris Cassidy
 Mike Smith
 Amanda Blake

References

External links
 

1970s English-language films
1978 films
1978 comedy-drama films
1978 comedy films
1978 drama films
American comedy-drama films
1970s American films